Liu Lifu (born 1 October 1955) is a former Chinese footballer.

Club career
Born in Beijing, Liu played for hometown team Beijing. In 1982, Beijing won the China National League, with 50% of Beijing's goals being assisted by Liu. In 1985, Liu joined Hong Kong First Division League club Tung Sing, before leaving in 1986 after the Hong Kong Football Association implemented player registration restrictions for non-Hongkongers. Following his spell with Tung Sing, Liu joined the Beijing Army team for a season, before retiring.

International career
On 6 October 1977, Liu made his debut for China in a 1–1 draw against the United States in China's first tour to the Western Bloc, following opening the scoring in a 1–1 draw against the New York Cosmos on 17 September 1977, in the Cosmos' tour of China.

International goals
Scores and results list China's goal tally first.

References

1955 births
Living people
Footballers from Beijing
Association football midfielders
Chinese footballers
China international footballers
Beijing Guoan F.C. players
Hong Kong First Division League players
Chinese expatriate footballers
Expatriate footballers in Hong Kong
Chinese expatriate sportspeople in Hong Kong
Footballers at the 1978 Asian Games
Medalists at the 1978 Asian Games
Asian Games bronze medalists for China
Asian Games medalists in football